Teddy Iribaren (born 25 September 1990) is a French rugby union player. His position is scrum-half and he currently plays for Racing 92 in the Top 14.

References

External links
Racing 92 profile
L'Équipe profile

1990 births
Living people
French rugby union players
Racing 92 players
Rugby union scrum-halves
French people of Basque descent
Rugby union players from Toulouse
Tarbes Pyrénées Rugby players
CA Brive players
Montpellier Hérault Rugby players
France international rugby union players